The Râușor is a right tributary of the Râul Târgului in Romania. It discharges into the Râușor Reservoir, which is drained by the Râul Târgului.

References

Rivers of Romania
Rivers of Argeș County